Turkey (listed as TUR) participated in the 2005 Mediterranean Games in Almería, Spain.  With one hundred female and one hundred ninety-six male athletes participating, Turkey garnered seventy-three medals, marking this as its most successful participation in an international multi-sport gaming event in its history.

Results by event

Archery
Men's individual
 Mehmet Darılmaz - 14th place
 Doğan Gürsel - 7th place
 Okyay Tunc Küçükkayalar - 11th place

Women's individual
 Derya Bard Sarıaltın Bronze medal
 Damla Günay - 14th place
 Zekiye Keskin Şatır - 11th place

Women's team
 Derya Bard Sarıaltın, Damla Günay, Zekiye Keskin Şatır – defeated Italy by 236-232 - Silver medal

Artistic gymnastics
 Göksu Üçtaş
 Ebru Karaduman

Athletics
Men's
 İsmail Aslan 100 m, 200 m
 Tuncay Örs 400 m Hurdles – 52.55' – 8th place
 Selahattin Çobanoğlu 800 m
 Ramazan Çuğlan 1500 m
 Halil Akkaş 3000 m Steeplechase
 Abdülkadir Türk Half marathon – 1:08:10.00 - 9th place
 Ercüment Olgundeniz Discus throw 59.16 m - Bronze medal
 Eşref Apak Hammer throw – 77.88 m -   Gold medal
 Ferhat Çiçek Long jump  – 7.50 m – 11th place
 Ferhat Çiçek Triple jump  – 16.03 m – 11th place
 Fatih Yazıcı Shot put 

Men's handicap
 Ömer Cantay 1500 m wheelchair 3:30.94 – 6th place

Women's
 Saliha Memiş 100 m - 12.09' 13th place at the semifinals
 Esen Kızıldağ 100 m Hurdles  13.97' – 7th place
 Birsen Bekgöz 200 m - 24.33' 9h place at the semifinals, 400 m Hurdles - 50.03' 14th place at the semifinals
 Pınar Saka 400 m – 54.75 – 7th place
 Özge Gürler 400 m Hurdles - 58.24' 11th place at the semifinals
 Anzhela Atroshchenko, Birsen Bekgöz, Özge Gürler, Saliha Memiş, Pınar Saka 4 × 100 m Relay – 45.93' – 6th place
 Anzhela Atroshchenko, Birsen Bekgöz, Özge Gürler, Saliha Memiş, Pınar Saka, Binnaz Uslu 4 × 400 m Relay – 3:40.75' -  Bronze medal
 Binnaz Uslu  800 m – 2:02.68' - Bronze medal
 Türkan Bozkurt Erişmiş Half marathon – 1:17:56.00 - 5th place
 Yeliz Ay 20 km Walk - not finished
 Candeğer Kılınçer Oğuz  High jump – 1.82 m – 5th place
 Filiz Kadoğan Shot put  16.45 m - 5th place
 Anzhela Atroshchenko Heptathlon (100 m Hurdles: 14.15' – 4th place -, 200 m: 25.26' 4th ace, 800 m: 2:16.61' – 4th place, High jump: 1.70 m – 5th place, Javelin throw: 40.73 m – 4th place, Long jump: 6.17 m – 3rd place, Shot put: 13.22 m – 3rd place) - 5,870p - Bronze medal

Basketball
Men
 Ender Arslan, Fırat Aydemir, Volkan Çetintahra, Hüseyin Demiral, Ermal Kurtoğlu, Reha Öz, Barış Özcan, Cevher Özer, Valentin Pastal, Kaya Peker, Kerem Tunçeri, Erkan Veyseloğlu -  4th place

Women
 Gülşah Akkaya, Korel Engin, Yasemin Horasan, Şaziye İvegin, Arzu Özyiğit, Esmeral Tunçluer, Birsel Vardarlı, Nilay Yiğit, Aylin Yıldızoğlu, Nevriye Yılmaz, Serap Yücesır, Müjde Yüksel Gold medal

Beach volleyball
Men
 Semih Çıtak, Mehmet Akif Gürgen, Bülent Kandemir, Erkan Togan

Women
 Ebru Bayram, Nejla Güçlü, Zülfiye Gündoğdu, Müjgan Keskin

Boxing
 Abdülkadir Koçak Light flyweight (48 kg) Bronze medal
 Atagün Yalçınkaya Flyweight (51 kg) Gold medal
 Serdar Avcı Bantamweight (54 kg) Bronze medal
 Yakup Kılıç Featherweight (57 kg) Bronze medal
 Selçuk Aydın Lightweight (60 kg) Silver medal
 Önder Şipal Super lightweight (64 kg) Bronze medal
 Bülent Ulusoy Welterweight (69 kg) Gold medal
 Savaş Kaya Middleweight (75 kg) Silver medal
 İhsan Yıldırım Tarhan Light heavyweight (81 kg) Silver medal
 Kurban Günebakan Super heavyweight (+91 kg)

Canoe, flat
Men's
 Akın Ağzer Çiçek K1 500 m
 Fırat Akça K1 1000 m
 Gökhan Bahadır, Tolga Turan K2 500 m
 Abdurrahman Demir, Murat Zeki Güçlü K2 1000 m

Women's
 İclal Maviş K1 500 m
 Gamze Togay K1 500 m K1 1000 m

Cycling, road
 Individual time trial
 Kemal Küçükbay – 13th place
 Mehmet Mutlu – 15th place

 Road race
 M. Mustafa Karaselek
 Kemal Küçükbay
 Mustafa Maral
 Mehmet Mutlu
 Orhan Şahin
 Behçet Usta

Equestrian
Individual jumping
 Sencer Can
 İhsan Sencer Horasan
 Hulki Karagülle
 İskender Pisak
 Ata Zorlu

Team jumping
 Sencer Can, Sencer Horasan, Hulki Karagülle, Ata Zorlu

Fencing
Men's individual épée
 Ulaş Barış Badoğlu

Men's individual foil
 Adnan Özsanat
 Utku Uluşahin

Men's individual sabre 
 Erdoğan Kızıldağ
 Kerem Seyfi Yıldırım

Women's individual épée 
 Emel Işık

Women's individual foil
 Ilgın Güçlüer
 Tuğba Nilay Güngör

Football
Men
 Volkan Babacan, Can Arat, Cafercan Aksu, Ertan Aktepe, Serhat Akyüz, Serkan Atak, Bulut Basmaz, İbrahim Dağaşan, Emre Hamzaoğlu, Bekir Irtegun, Ramazan Kahya, Doğa Kaya, Serdar Kurtuluş, Muhammet Reis, Soner Sakarya, Feridun Sungur, Arda Turan, Sezgin Yılmaz – lost to Spain by 0-1 - Silver medal

Golf
Men's
Individual
 Mustafa Hocaoğlu – 295p- 5th place
 Gencer Özcan – 299p- 6th place
 Hamza Hakan Sayın – 294p - Bronze medal

Team
 Mustafa Hocaoğlu, Gencer Özcan, Hamza Hakan Sayın – 583p - Silver medal

Women's
Individual
 Nejla Gerçek – 316p – 9th place
 Zakire Korkmaz – 336p – 17th place
 Elçin Ulu – 331p – 15th place

Team
 Nejla Gerçek, Zakire Korkmaz, Elçin Ulu – 641p – 4th place

Handball
Men
 Şevket Altuğ, Şenol Boyar, Oğuzhan Büyük, İbrahim Demir, Ramazan Döne, Bülent Erkol, Cavit Eyövge, Okan Halay, Enis Kahya, Volga Karslıoğlu, Ümit Kırkayak, Taner Öymen, Hüseyin Pamuk, Ömer Savaş, Okan Yalçıner, Yasin Yüzbaşıoğlu

Women
 Sevda Akbulut, Güneş Atabay, Duygu Aydoğan, Asiye Çelik, Sevilay İmamoğlu, Serpil İskenderoğlu, Eda Maden, Seda Maden, Gonca Nahçıvanlı, Melda Deniz Olcay, Yeliz Özel, Esra Sarı, Serpil Soylu, Nergis Türkay, Ceren Üstün, Yeliz Yılmaz – 5th place

Judo
Men's
 Halil İbrahim Uzun -60 kg – 4th place
 Bektaş Demirel 60–66 kg Bronze medal
 Sezer Huysuz 66–73 kg Silver medal
 İrakli Uznadze 73–81 kg
 Burhan Koçan 81–90 kg Bronze medal
 Murat Gemalmaz 90–100 kg
 Selim Tataroğlu +100 kg Gold medal

Women's
 Neşe Şensoy Yıldız -48 kg Bronze medal
 Aynur Samat 48–52 kg Silver medal
 Özge Nur Akyüz 52–57 kg
 Canan Kastan 57–63 kg
 Ebru Aktan 63–70 kg
 Seda Karadağ 73–78 kg Bronze medal
 Belkıs Zehra Kaya +78 kg Gold medal

Karate
Men's
 Şevket Baştürk -60 kg Bronze medal
 Bahattin Kandaz 60–65 kg
 Haldun Alagas 65–70 kg
 İsmail Hakkı Şen 70–75 kg
 Zeynel Çelik 75–80 kg Bronze medal
 Okay Arpa +80 kg
 Yusuf Başer Open Bronze medal

Women's
 Vildan Doğan -50 kg Bronze medal
 Gülderen Çelik 50–55 kg
 Esra Sertdemir 55–60 kg
 Gülcihan Ustaoğlu 60–65 kg Bronze medal
 Yıldız Aras +65 kg  Silver medal
 Yıldız Aras Open  Gold medal

Rhythmic gymnastics
All-Around
 Gizem Oylumlu – 48.275p – 10th place
 Berfin Serdil Sütcü – 49.425p – 9th place

Rowing
 Men's
 Hasan Özcan Single sculls 
 Saim Kaya, Saim Kaya Double sculls   Silver medal
 İhsan Emre Vural, Ahmet Yumrukaya Lightweight coxless pair  Bronze medal
 Mete Yeltepe Lightweight single sculls   Silver medal
 Atakan Çolak, Murat Türker Lightweight double sculls

Sailing
 Men's
Single-handed Dinghy-Laser
 Kemal Muslubaş – 96p – 11th place
 Güray Zümbül – 125p – 13th place

Double-handed Dinghy-470
 Okan Akdağ, Levent Peynirci – 118p – 12th place
 Efe Karakaplan, Hakan Karakaplan – 135p – 13th place

Windsurfer - Mistral
 Koray Ezer – 77p - 7th place

 Women's
 Ayda Ünver Single-handed Dinghy-Laser – 88p – 9th place

Shooting
Men
 Yusuf Dikeç 10 m Air pistol – 681p -  Silver medal
 Aydın Güçlü 10 m Air pistol
 Halil İbrahim Öztürk 10 m Air rifle – 694.7p (Turkey record)  Bronze medal
 Halil İbrahim Öztürk  50 m Rifle 3 positions
 Abdurrahman Akgün 50 m rifle prone - 7th place
 Murat Şahin 50 m Rifle prone
 Yusuf Karamuk Skeet
 Güçhan Olker Skeet
 Oğuzhan Tüzün Trap – 4th place

Women
 Saliha Kurteş 10 m Air rifle
 Nihan Gürer Trap

Swimming
Men's 
 Emre Çelik 100 m Backstroke, 200 m Backstroke
 Ömer Aslanoğlu 50 m Breaststroke, 100 m Breaststroke
 Engin Can Eter 50 m Breaststroke, 100 m Breaststroke, 200 m Breaststroke
 Mert Karşıyakalılar 50 m Butterfly, 100 m Butterfly
 Onur Uras 50 m Butterfly, 100 m Butterfly, 200 m Butterfly
 Eren Onurlu 50 m Butterfly, 100 m Freestyle
 Aytekin Mindan 200 m Freestyle

Men's Handicap S/10
 İsmet Ayık 100 m Freestyle
 Mustafa Yılmaz 100 m Freestyle

Women's 
 Gizem Papila 50 m Freestyle
 Derya Erke 100 m Backstroke – 1:04.84' -  8th place
 Gülşah Gönenç 200 m Butterfly 2:15.57' Turkey record
 Özlem Yasemin Taşkın 800 m Freestyle

Table tennis
Men's 
 Halil Hacı Single, Double
 İrfan Tavukçuoğlu Single, Double

Women's 
 Azize Baş Single, Double
 Ayşe Şen Single, Double

Tennis
Men's 
 Haluk Akkoyun Single, Double
 Ergun Zorlu Double
 Ümit Barış Ergüden Single

Women's 
 Çağla Büyükakçay Single
 Pemra Özgen Single
 Çağla Büyükakçay, Pemra Özgen Double lost to Italy by 0-2 -  4th place

Volleyball
Men
 Hakan Akışık, Osman Babagiray, Orhan Cinoğlu, Arslan Ekşi, Barış Hamaz, Özkan Hayırlı, İzzet C. Kartaltepe, Ulaş Kıyak, İsmail Cem Kurtar, Ömer Laçin, Soner Mezgitçi – lost to Greece by 2-3 - 8th place

Women
 Elif Ağca, Neslihan Demir, Deniz Hakyemez, Natalia Hanikoğlu, Gülden Kayalar, Eda Erdem, Gözde Kırdar, Aysun Özbek, Özlem Özçelik, Fatma D. Sipahioğlu, Seda Tokatlıoğlu, Bahar Mert – won Greece by 3-0 - Gold medal

Water polo
Men
 Halil Beşkardeşler, Hakan Çalışır, Emre Coşkun, Orkun Darnel, Can Güven, Yiğithan Hantal, Sezai Kayhan Kızıltan, Oytun Okman, Atilla Sezer, Cahit Sılay, Anıl Sönmez, Michael Taylan, Aytaç Yeğin – 8th place

Weightlifting

Men's
 Gülbeyi Aktı 56 kg Snatch: 113 kg Gold medal, Clean and jerk: 141 kg Silver medal
 Sedat Artuç 62 kg  Snatch: 126 kg Silver medal, Clean and jerk: 160 kg Gold medal
 Yasin Arslan 69 kg Snatch:Silver medal
 Ekrem Celil 69 kg Snatch:Bronze medal, Clean and jerk Gold medal
 Reyhan Arabacıoğlu 77 kg Clean and jerk: Silver medal
 Mehmet Yılmaz 77 kg Snatch:Silver medal, Clean and jerk Bronze medal
 İzzet İnce 85 kg
 Bünyamin Sudaş 105 kg : Snatch: 178 kg Silver medal, Clean and jerk: 226 kg (MR) Gold medal

Women's
 Sibel Özkan 48 kg Snatch: 70 kg 4th place, Clean and jerk: 90 kg Silver medal
 Emine Karademir 53 kg Snatch: 77 kg – 6th place, Clean and jerk: 90 kg – 7th place
 Nurcan Taylan 53 kg Snatch: 87 kg (MR), Gold medal, Clean and jerk: 108 kg (MR), Gold medal
 Emine Bilgin 58 kg Snatch: 91 kg -  Gold medal, Clean and jerk: 110 kg Bronze medal

Wrestling
Men's Greco-Roman style:
 Erkan Dündar 55 kg Bronze medal
 Uğur Tüfenk 60 kg Bronze medal
 Selçuk Çebi 66 kg Gold medal
 Mahmut Altay 74 kg Gold medal
 Serkan Özden 84 kg Silver medal
 Mehmet Özal 96 kg Bronze medal
 Yekta Yılmaz Gül 120 kg Silver medal

Men's freestyle
 Ramazan Demir 55 kg Bronze medal
 Tevfik Odabaşı 60 kg Silver medal
 Levent Kaleli 66 kg Bronze medal
 Fahrettin Özata 74 kg Silver medal
 Serhat Balcı 84 kg Gold medal
 Hakan Koç 96 kg Gold medal
 Aydın Polatçı 120 kg Gold medal

Women's
 Zeynep Yıldırım 51 kg Silver medal
 Nadir Uğrun Perçin 59 kg

See also
 Turkey at the 2004 Summer Olympics
 Turkey at the 2008 Summer Olympics

References
 2005 Mediterranean Games web site
 Official Site

Nations at the 2005 Mediterranean Games
2005
Mediterranean Games